Night of Mystery is a 1937 American mystery film directed by E.A. Dupont and starring Grant Richards, Roscoe Karns and Helen Burgess. The film was a remake of The Greene Murder Case (1929), adapted from a 1928 novel of the same name. Because of this it is sometimes known by the alternative title The Greene Murder Case.

Cast
 Grant Richards as Philo Vance  
 Roscoe Karns as Sgt. Heath 
 Helen Burgess as Ada Greene 
 Ruth Coleman as Sibella Greene 
 Elizabeth Patterson as Mrs. Tobias Greene 
 Harvey Stephens as Dr. Von Blon 
 June Martel as Barton 
 Ellen Drew as Secretary 
 Purnell Pratt as John F. X. Markham 
 Colin Tapley as Chester Greene  
 James Bush as Rex Greene 
 Ivan F. Simpson as Sproot  
 Greta Meyer as Mrs. Mannheim  
 Leonard Carey as Lister  
 Nora Cecil as Hemming

References

Bibliography
 Goble, Alan. The Complete Index to Literary Sources in Film. Walter de Gruyter, 1999.

External links

1937 films
American mystery films
American black-and-white films
1937 mystery films
1930s English-language films
Films directed by E. A. Dupont
Paramount Pictures films
Remakes of American films
Films based on American novels
Films produced by Robert North
1930s American films
Philo Vance films